The Washington Federation of Independent Schools (WFIS) is an umbrella organization of private and independent schools in the U.S. state of Washington, informally representing Washington in the Office of Private Education.

Purpose
As laid out by the executives of the federation, the goals of WFIS are:

To promote the vital role of private schools in Washington education and their significant contributions to educating the public and promoting the common good.
To promote the rights of parents to educate their children in the schools of their choice.
To encourage excellence and pluralism in education, and to promote the rights of private schools to fulfill their unique missions.
To foster the participation of the private school community in shaping the state's education agenda, and to develop and promote positions on educational policy.
To assure equitable access to all services to which private schools are entitled, while allowing them to maintain their independence.

References

Private and independent school organizations in the United States
School accreditors